The Hawaii Rugby Union is the local governing body for rugby union teams in the state of Hawaii. Rugby Hawaii Inc. is a non-profit organization and an associate union (AU) under the umbrella of  the national organization, USA Rugby.

History
Rugby union in Hawaii was effectively established with the founding of the Hawaii Harlequins Club in 1964, although occasional games had been played earlier in Hawaiian history as far back as 1884.

The Harlequins staged annual invitational tournaments in the 1980s at Kapiolani Park, that attracted teams from the around the Asia-Pacific, Australasia and North America which promoted the development of rugby in Hawaii.

The original Hawaii Rugby Football Union was founded in 1975, and they selected teams from 1976 onwards to make tours to the United States mainland as well as other rugby destinations including Australia and New Zealand. Hawaii also played in the curtain raiser for the 1987 World Cup in New Zealand, defeating Rotorua.

Hawaii Youth Rugby was founded as a non-profit organization in 2004 to build rugby programs for boys and girls and increase participation in rugby. It became a State Based Rugby Organization (SBRO) under the USA Rugby umbrella in 2009.

Clubs

Men’s
Laie Tanoa 
Laie Rhinos
Kalihi Raiders
Marist
Titans
Hawaii Harlequins 
Western Bulldogs
Kona Hawks
Hilo Reign

Women’s
Lady Raiders
Lady Titans

Youth

Big Island
Hilo Reign Youth
Keaukaha Sharks
Kona Bulls
Puna Chiefs
Waimea Boars

Oahu
Kahuku Red Raiders
Laie Rugby
Pasefika

References

External links

Archives
 Former site of 
 Former site of 
 Former site of 
 Former site of 

Rugby union in Hawaii
Rugby union governing bodies in the United States
1975 establishments in Hawaii